Bank of Echo Building is located in Echo, Oregon.  It was built in 1920 and added to the National Register of Historic Places on April 15, 1982.

Bank history
Articles of incorporation for the Bank of Echo were filed with the Oregon Secretary of State in the week ending April 3, 1905. J.H. Koontz, W.J. Furnish, and R.B. Stanfield were named as incorporators.  The capital stock was stated to be $25,000.

Present building use
The building now houses the Echo Historical Museum, a museum of local history.

References

External links
 Echo Historical Museum - Facebook site

Bank buildings on the National Register of Historic Places in Oregon
Beaux-Arts architecture in Oregon
Commercial buildings completed in 1920
Buildings and structures in Umatilla County, Oregon
National Register of Historic Places in Umatilla County, Oregon
1920 establishments in Oregon
Echo, Oregon
Museums in Umatilla County, Oregon